Arafat Sunny (born 29 September 1986) is a Bangladeshi first-class cricketer. A left-handed batsman and slow left arm orthodox bowler, he made his debut for Dhaka Division in the 2001–02 season. He currently plays first-class cricket for Dhaka Metropolis, and Twenty20 cricket for the Rangpur Rangers.

In 2016, he was selected in Bangladesh's squad for the 2016 ICC World Twenty20. However, he was later suspended from bowling in international cricket due to an illegal action bowled during the tournament.

In October 2018, he was named in the squad for the Rajshahi Kings team, following the draft for the 2018–19 Bangladesh Premier League. He was the leading wicket-taker for the team in the tournament, with sixteen dismissals in twelve matches. He was also the leading wicket-taker for Dhaka Metropolis in the 2018–19 National Cricket League, with twenty-three dismissals in five matches. In November 2019, he was selected to play for the Rangpur Rangers in the 2019–20 Bangladesh Premier League.

Legal issues 
On 22 January 2017, police raided Sunny's home in the Dhakka suburb of Aminbazar after his longtime girlfriend filed a complaint. Sunny could face up to 14 years in jail or a fine of 10 million taka ($126,340). 
Sunny along with his mother was under investigation for demanding dowry from a woman, claiming to be his wife. The international player has been charged under the Women and Children Repression Prevention Act. A court ordered them to be put in jail on 13 February 2017

References

1986 births
Living people
Bangladeshi cricketers
Dhaka Division cricketers
Chattogram Challengers cricketers
Bangladesh One Day International cricketers
Bangladesh Twenty20 International cricketers
Cricketers at the 2015 Cricket World Cup
Asian Games medalists in cricket
Cricketers at the 2014 Asian Games
Asian Games bronze medalists for Bangladesh
Medalists at the 2014 Asian Games
Dhaka Metropolis cricketers
Barisal Division cricketers
Rangpur Riders cricketers
Gazi Tank cricketers
Sheikh Jamal Dhanmondi Club cricketers
Kala Bagan Krira Chakra cricketers
Mohammedan Sporting Club cricketers
Brothers Union cricketers
Bangladesh East Zone cricketers
Bangladesh Central Zone cricketers
Bangladesh under-23 cricketers
Bangladesh A cricketers
Prime Doleshwar Sporting Club cricketers
Rajshahi Royals cricketers